This is a list of hospitals in Switzerland.

As of 2009, Switzerland had 313 hospitals – 129 general hospitals, 59 psychiatric hospitals, 53 rehabilitation clinics and 72 other specialty clinics. These hospitals had a total capacity of 39,539 patients and generated operating costs of CHF 20,5 billion per year (US$ ).

List

 Am Rosenberg Clinic, Heiden
 Andreas Clinic, Cham
 Beau-Site Clinic, Bern
 Belair Clinic, Schaffhausen
 Bethesda-Spital, Basel
 Birshof Clinic, Basel
 , Biel-Bienne
 Bruderholzspital, Basel
 Bürgerspital, Solothurn
 Geneva University Hospitals, Geneva
 University Hospital of Lausanne (CHUV), Lausanne
 Hirslanden Clinique Cecil, Lausanne
 Hirslanden Clinique Bois-Cerf, Lausanne
 Hirslanden Clinique La Colline, Geneva
 Clinique de Montchoisi, Lausanne
 Clinique Générale St-Anne Fribourg
 Clinique Laclaire Montreux
 Clinique La Source Lausanne
 Claraspital, Basel
 Ente Ospedaliero Cantonale, Ticino
 Felix Platter-Spital, Basel
 Hirslanden Clinic, Zurich
 Hirslanden Clinic, Aarau
 Im Park Clinic, Zurich
 Kantonsspital, Aarau
 Kantonsspital, Olten
 Kantonsspital, Baden
 Kantonsspital, Liestal
 Kantonsspital, Lucerne
 Kantonsspital St. Gallen
 Kantonsspital, Männedorf
 La Ligniere Clinic, Gland
 Lindenhofspital, Bern
 Merian Iselin-Spital, Basel
 Ospedale Civico, Lugano
 Ospedale Italiano, Lugano
 Ospedale San Giovanni, Bellinzona
 Permanence Clinic, Bern
 Regionalspital, Burgdorf
 Regionalspital, Langenthal
 Regionalspital, Langnau im Emmental
 Regionalspital, Thun
 Salem Hospital, Bern
 See Spital, Zurich
 Spital Bülach, Bülach
 St. Anna Clinic, Lucerne
 Stadtspital Triemli, Zurich
 Swiss Paraplegic Centre, Nottwil
 Sonnenhof Hospitals Ltd., Klinik Sonnenhof & Klinik Engeried Bern
 Spital Thusis, Graubünden
 Tiefenauspital, Bern
 University Hospital of Basel
 University Hospital of Bern
 University Hospital of Zurich
 Waidspital, Zurich
 Zieglerspital, Bern
 Klinik Gut St.Moritz
 Regionalspital Samedan

References

See also 

 List of university hospitals
 Healthcare in Switzerland

Switzerland

Hospitals
Switzerland